In molecular biology, the eukaryotic translation initiation factor 4E family (eIF-4E) is a family of proteins that bind to the cap structure of eukaryotic cellular mRNAs. Members of this family recognise and bind the 7-methyl-guanosine-containing (m7Gppp) cap during an early step in the initiation of protein synthesis and facilitate ribosome binding to an mRNA by inducing the unwinding of its secondary structures. A tryptophan in the central part of the sequence of human eIF-4E seems to be implicated in cap-binding.

Members of this family include EIF4E, EIF4E2, EIF4E3 and EIF4E1B.

References

External links
 
 

Protein domains